Kenneth A. Miller (born October 27, 1966) is an American educator and Republican politician from Oklahoma. Miller was the 18th Oklahoma State Treasurer, having won that position in the 2010 state election and served the maximum 2 four year terms allowed under state term limits.

Miller formerly served as a state representative for District 81 in the Oklahoma House of Representatives which included portions of Edmond, Oklahoma. Miller was the chair of the House's Appropriations and Budget Committee, which had legislative oversight of fiscal policy and budget.

Early life
Ken Miller earned his Bachelor of Science degree from Lipscomb University in 1989, his Master of Business Administration from Pepperdine University in 1993, and a doctoral degree from the University of Oklahoma. He began his professional career in banking at First American National Bank before joining MediFax-EDS as the financial operations manager. He joined Oklahoma Christian University as a professor of Economics in 1998.

Keating Administration
In 1998, Republican incumbent Governor of Oklahoma Frank Keating was elected to his second term as governor. During that term, Governor Keating appointed Miller as the chairman of the Oklahoma Board on Legislative Compensation. The board is responsible for establishing the salary received by each member of the legislature. While chairman, he worked to enforce a freeze on legislative salaries and rejected any increase in compensation during his four years leading the Board.

State representative
In 2004, Miller was elected as a Republican to the Oklahoma House of Representatives, representing the 81st House District, during the 2004 elections that resulted in Republican control of the House of Representatives for the first time since 1920. Miller was reelected in 2006 and 2008.

Miller's financial background led his Republican colleagues to elect him as vice-chair of the House Appropriations and Budget Committee in 2006. One year later he was elevated to the position of chair, where he served for three years.

State treasurer
Ken Miller won the Republican nomination for state treasurer by defeating former State Sen. Owen Laughlin, earning 63% of the primary votes.

In the general election, Ken Miller gained the endorsement of outgoing Democratic State Treasurer Scott Meacham (who chose not to seek re-election), and thus handily defeated his Democratic opponent Stephen Covert by 2–1 margin, with Miller winning almost 67% of the vote and winning each of Oklahoma's 77 counties.

Miller assumed office as state treasurer on January 10, 2011. He resigned effective January 2, 2019.

Electoral history

References

External links
 Project Vote Smart Profile
 Campaign Contributions: 2008, 2006, 2004

|-

|-

1966 births
21st-century American politicians
Heads of Oklahoma state agencies
Lipscomb University alumni
Living people
Republican Party members of the Oklahoma House of Representatives
People from Edmond, Oklahoma
Pepperdine University alumni
State treasurers of Oklahoma
University of Oklahoma alumni